Pa Tio Tio Gap is a glacier-filled gap at 1,000 m. It trends east–west between Robertson Massif and Endeavour Massif in Kirkwood Range, Victoria Land, Antarctica. "Pa Tio Tio" is a Māori word meaning "frozen over".

Mountain passes of Victoria Land
Scott Coast